Ihor Martynenko (born 24 August 1970) is a Ukrainian rower. He competed in the men's eight event at the 1996 Summer Olympics.

References

1970 births
Living people
Ukrainian male rowers
Olympic rowers of Ukraine
Rowers at the 1996 Summer Olympics
Place of birth missing (living people)